L'avvocato Porta is an Italian crime television series directed by Franco Giraldi.

Cast

 Gigi Proietti: Lawyer Antonio Porta
 Ornella Muti: Chiara
 Fiorenzo Fiorentini: Mr. Costanzo
 Ninetto Davoli: Remondino
 Nicola Pistoia: Inspector Gargiulo
 Luisa De Santis: Renata
 Karin Proia: Patrizia Sorgi
 Edoardo Leo: Vincenzo

External links
 

Italian legal television series
1997 Italian television series debuts
2000 Italian television series endings
Canale 5 original programming